The Spira Cultural Center is a cultural center in Jönköping, Sweden. It was opened on 11 November 2011.

References

External links

Spira 

2011 establishments in Sweden
Buildings and structures in Jönköping
Music venues completed in 2011
Culture in Jönköping
Theatres completed in 2011